This is the discography of British band Scritti Politti.

Albums

Studio albums

Compilation albums

Video albums

EPs

Singles

References

Discographies of British artists
Pop music group discographies
Rock music group discographies
New wave discographies